Åsa Elzén (born 1972) is a Swedish artist.

She has participated in events, performances, public talks and seminars including at The Armory Show New York; and Lilith Performance Studio, Malmö, Sweden.

Education

Elzén studied sculpture at the National College of Art, Dublin in the nineties. She received an M.F.A. from the Royal University College of Fine Art in Stockholm in 2002 and was a participant in the Whitney Museum of American Art’s Independent Study Program from 2007 to 2008.

Exhibitions (selection)
 2012 Mary Wollstonecraft’s Scandinavian journey 1795 re-traced, uqbar, Berlin, curated by Antje Weitzel
 2012 Mary Wollstonecraft’s Scandinavian journey 1795 re-traced, Kalmar Konstmuseum, Kalmar, Sweden, curated by Martin Schibli
 2009 The guide and the seeing man, Eskilstuna Konstmuseum, Eskilstuna, Sweden
 2005 Systerskapets år/A Year of Sisterhood as archive, in collaboration with Sonia Hedstrand, ak28, Stockholm, curated by Johanna Gustafsson-Fürst
 2004 Woojegil Museum, exhibition and workshop in collaboration with Ylva Elzén in connection with the 5th Gwangju Biennale, South Korea, curated by Jongkee Chae

Publications
 1997. Stilleben in Sodom: 9.12.1997- 18.1.1998. 
 2012. Who fooled whom? Mary Wollstonecraft's Scandinanian journey 1795 re-traced. [Berlin]: : Åsa Elzén.

References

External links
 Official Website for Åsa Elzén

Feminist artists
Swedish artists
Living people
1972 births
Artists from Berlin